Ali Mohsen Al-Moraisi (1940 – 1993) was a Yemeni professional footballer who played as a forward. He was the first Yemeni player to play in the Egyptian League, with Zamalek in the 1960s. Mohsen was also the first foreigner to ever finish as top-scorer of the Egyptian League.

Mohsen once scored against Real Madrid in 1961, in a 7–1 defeat, while playing for an Egyptian select side with several players from Zamalek, Al Ahly and Al Masry.

After retiring from his playing career, he coached Somalia in 1973, and Al-Satra in Southern Yemen, before moving to Johar Al-Rab. The national stadium in Sana'a is named after the player. He was appointed councilor for Minister of Youth and Sports until his death in 1994. The Ali Mohsen Al-Moraisi Tournament has been played annually in his honour since 1992, in cooperation with Aden Football Association.

Honours and achievements

Player
Al Zamalek
Egyptian Premier League: 1960, 1964, 1965
Egypt Cup: 1958, 1959, 1960, 1962

Manager
Horseed
Somalia League: 1972, 1973, 1974

Individual
 Egyptian Premier League Top goalscorers 1960/61.

See also 
 Ali Muhesen Stadium
 Ali Muhsin Cup

References

External links

1993 deaths
Yemeni footballers
Yemeni expatriate footballers
1940 births
Zamalek SC players
1976 AFC Asian Cup managers
Egyptian Premier League players
Yemeni expatriate sportspeople in Egypt
Expatriate footballers in Egypt
Association football forwards
Yemeni football managers